Rebekka Johnson is an American actress, comedian and writer, producer from Staten Island, New York. Johnson is best known for playing Dawn Rivecca on Netflix's wrestling comedy GLOW. She was featured on MTV's prank show Boiling Points. Johnson has been performing with her musical comedy group The Apple Sisters along with her GLOW co-star Kimmy Gatewood and Sarah Lowe since 2007.

The Apple Sisters
Johnson is co-creator of The Apple Sisters, a World War II musical comedy trio. The group, which consists of Kimmy Gatewood, Rebekka Johnson, and Sarah Lowe, started in 2007 in New York City. They received wide acclaim at the 2008 Montreal Just For Laughs Comedy Festival, which lead them to move to Los Angeles where they continually perform. She is a co-creator of the award winning Apple Sisters which performed at this festival.

Filmography

Film

Television

References

External links 

Rebekka Johnson on Facebook
Rebekka Johnson on Instagram
Rebekka Johnson on Twitter

Living people
People from Staten Island
American film actresses
American television actresses
American women comedians
20th-century American actresses
20th-century American comedians
21st-century American actresses
21st-century American comedians
Year of birth missing (living people)